Nick Lowe and His Cowboy Outfit is a 1984 album by British singer-songwriter Nick Lowe. The record marked the official debut of Lowe's new band, the Cowboy Outfit (although all of the band members had appeared on Lowe's previous album, The Abominable Showman). Nick Lowe and His Cowboy Outfit was reissued in 2000 by Demon Music Group.

Nick Lowe and His Cowboy Outfit incorporates more of a roots rock feel than Lowe's previous albums, including nods to Tex-Mex music ("Half a Boy and Half a Man"), 1950s guitar instrumentals ("Awesome"), and country music (via a cover of Faron Young's "Live Fast, Love Hard, Die Young"). Other notable tracks include the soul-influenced "L.A.F.S."—which was co-produced and arranged by Elvis Costello (a role reversal of sorts, as Lowe had produced Costello's first five albums).

The album also includes a cover of Mickey Jupp's "You'll Never Get Me Up in One of Those", which had been previously recorded by Lowe's former Rockpile bandmate Dave Edmunds (the Edmunds version can be heard on his album Twangin...). Rockpile had also played as backing band on the Jupp original, on his 1978 album Juppanese.

Reception 

Despite good reviews (including a B+ grade from critic Robert Christgau), Nick Lowe and His Cowboy Outfit only reached No. 113 on the Billboard 200. The first single off the album, "Half a Boy and Half a Man", would become a moderate chart hit in the UK, reaching No. 53.

Track listing
All songs written by Nick Lowe except as noted.
"Half a Boy and Half a Man" – 2:52
"Breakaway" (Tom Springfield) – 3:38
"You'll Never Get Me Up in One of Those" (Mickey Jupp) – 4:38
"Love Like a Glove" (Carlene Carter, James Eller) – 3:14
"The Gee and the Rick and the Three Card Trick" – 4:19
"(Hey Big Mouth) Stand Up and Say That" – 2:47
"Awesome" (Lowe, Profile) – 2:48
"God's Gift to Women" – 3:30
"Maureen" – 3:04
"L.A.F.S." – 3:32
"Live Fast, Love Hard, Die Young" (Joe Allison) – 2:39

Note: the US and UK versions of the album had different track orders; the above is the US order. However, there are no song differences between the two.

Personnel
Nick Lowe – vocals, bass guitar, guitar
Martin Belmont – guitar
Paul Carrack – keyboards, backing vocals
Bobby Irwin – drums, backing vocals
Billy Bremner – guitar on "Break Away" and "Love Like A Glove"
Bobby Valentino – fiddle on "God's Gift To Women"
TKO Horns (Jeff Blythe – saxophone; Jimmy Paterson – trombone; Dave Plews – trumpet; Paul Speare – saxophone) – horns on "L.A.F.S."

Production credits
Produced by Nick Lowe, Colin Fairley, Paul Riley – (tracks 1–9 and 11) & Elvis Costello, Colin Fairley – (track 10)
Recorded and Mixed at Ampro Studios – Shepherds Bush, Riverside Studios – Chiswick, Eden Studios – Acton, Boathouse Studios – Twickenham
Engineering assistants Colin Phillips, Tony Phillips, Chris Ludwinski
String Arrangements by Robert Kirby – (track 10)
Horn Arrangement by Elvis Costello – (track 10)

Notes

External links
 

1984 albums
Nick Lowe albums
Albums produced by Paul Riley (musician)
Albums produced by Nick Lowe
Albums produced by Elvis Costello
F-Beat Records albums
Columbia Records albums
RCA Records albums